NGC 518 is a spiral galaxy located in the Pisces constellation. It was discovered by Albert Marth on 17 December 1864.

See also 
 Spiral galaxy 
 List of NGC objects (1–1000)
 Pisces (constellation)

References

External links

Deep Sky Browser - NGC518
Aladin previewer - image

518
Spiral galaxies
Pisces (constellation)
18641217
Discoveries by Albert Marth
000952
005161
MCG objects